The Batten Kill Railroad  is a class III railroad operating in New York. The BKRR was formed in 1982 beginning operations on October 22 of a pair of abandoned Delaware and Hudson Railway branch lines, totaling about 30 miles of track.

History
The Greenwich and Johnsonville Railway (G&J) was incorporated in the late part of the 19th century, and built a rail line between Greenwich and Johnsonville, New York.

Around 1900, G&J became a subsidiary of the Delaware and Hudson Railway (D&H). By 1907, the G&J (with support from parent D&H) had built a branch from Greenwich to Greenwich Junction (just south of Salem) where it connected to the D&H's Washington Branch that was built circa 1856. The old G&J route to Johnsonville was abandoned in July 1932 and all traffic henceforth went via "The Junction" in Salem.  Most of the abandoned section to Johnsonville eventually became (Washington) County Route 74.   

Following the 1980 closure of the Georgia Pacific pulp & paper mill in Thomson, New York, the D&H planned to abandon the G&J along with the adjoining Washington Branch, which ran from Eagle Bridge, New York to Castleton, Vermont. In 1982, Mohawk-Hudson Transportation, owned by Ron Crowd, purchased the railroad from the D&H, forming the Batten Kill Railroad. Crowd had the distinction of being the first African-American to own and operate a railroad in the United States.

While initially financially successful, a series of national railroad strikes in the mid-1980s left the railroad in a less profitable state. In 1994, the railroad was turned over to NE New York Rail, a non-profit, and the BKRR remained the operator. Passenger excursions were started, but were terminated by late 2003 due to declining ridership. In November 2008, William (Bill) Taber purchased the Batten Kill from Mohawk Transportation and the estate of the late Ron Crowd. Taber is the current President and CEO of the railroad.

Rail assistance programs
In 2016 theBatten Kill Railroad got a $1.3 million state grant funding installation of new cross ties onto about 4 miles of track.

Route
The Batten Kill's sole interchange location is in Eagle Bridge, New York where it connects to the main line of Pan Am Railways (formerly Guilford Transportation and the Boston & Maine). The line runs north from Eagle Bridge, through Cambridge, New York and Shushan, New York, to Greenwich Junction. From there, a short remnant of the D&H Washington Branch continues north into Salem, New York. This segment is out of service. This north-south component of the line is paralleled by NY Route 22. The other route from the junction continues west to the village of Greenwich, paralleled by NY Route 29. The line running west from Greenwich to Thomson, New York, is also out of service. In Greenwich, the railroad maintains a small engine house and the former G&J depot as an office.

References

See also

The Battenkill Railroad on Gino's Railpage

New York (state) railroads
Spin-offs of the Delaware and Hudson Railway